Qixia District is one of 11 districts of Nanjing, the capital of Jiangsu province, China, straddling both sides of the Yangtze River.

It has an area of 80 km2 and a population of 400,000.

Natural and historical sites
Qixia Mountain is in Qixia District. Qixia Temple, a Southern Tang Buddhist temple, is there. During the Qing dynasty, the Qianlong Emperor praised it as the most elegant mountain in Jinling.

A number of Liang dynasty tombs are in the district, primarily in and around the Ganjiaxiang section of the district. Among them, particularly well known is that of Xiao Xiu (475–518), containing one of the best surviving sets of the period's statuary.

Geography
Qixia District includes northern and northeastern parts of the greater Nanjing area, on the right (southeastern) side of the Yangtze River.

Administration divisions 
Qixia District administers 10 subdistricts. They are:

Subdistricts

Economy
Qixia Town is an important land and water transport hub. It is connected to the Shanghai-Nanjing Railway. The No. 312 National Highway and Qixia Highway runs through it.

It is also connected to the adjacent Second Yangtze River Bridge and Xinshengwei Port to the west, and Shanghai-Nanjing Expressway to the south, opposite the Yangtze River to the north, and east of Longtan Deep Water Port.

Education 
Qixia district is the location of the Xianlin University City which hosts ten major universities from Jiangsu province.

The Nanjing International School (NIS) is a Pre-K - 12 school for foreign students. The Japanese Weekend School of Nanjing (南京日本語補習授業校 Nankin Nihongo Hoshū Jugyō Kō), a Japanese weekend program, holds its classes at NIS.

Geography 
Qixia is 16 km from Nanjing City Central Business District and 40 km from Nanjing Lukou International Airport.

References

External links
 Qixia District Government Website 

Districts of Nanjing
County-level divisions of Jiangsu